Bartonville is a town in Denton County, Texas, United States. The population was 1,469 at the 2010 census.

History

Bartonville was originally part of the Chinn's Chapel settlement, but then it decided to change to a place that was established in 1853 by Elisha Chinn. Chinn's Chapel eventually became three small communities, with Bartonville being the lone remaining town. Bartonville was settled in 1878 and was named for T. Bent Barton. In 1886 a local post office was established, and by 1890 Bartonville had 25 residents, a general store, a gristmill, and a cotton gin, all owned by the Barton family. By 1896 Bartonville's population was estimated at 100 and the town had three general stores. The post office was discontinued in 1906. Slow growth continued, and by 1930 Bartonville had a population of 300 and a business establishment.

In 1960, with cities such as Irving looking to expand northward, local residents feared annexation and Bartonville incorporated for the first time. The town then included Double Oak and Copper Canyon, as well as present-day Bartonville. Once the fear of annexation subsided a few years later, Bartonville citizens voted for disincorporation.

The present town of Bartonville was incorporated in 1973, and the town has continued to grow as part of the general development of the area north of Dallas/Fort Worth International Airport. Bartonville is adjacent to the master-planned Lantana residential development, which is currently not incorporated.

Geography

Bartonville is located at  (33.076965, –97.152027).

Demographics

As of the census of 2000, there were 1,093 people, 382 households, and 323 families residing in the town. The population density was 181.2 people per square mile (70.0/km2). There were 391 housing units at an average density of 64.8 per square mile (25.0/km2). The racial makeup of the town was 97.62% White, 0.91% Asian, 0.55% from other races, and 0.91% from two or more races. Hispanic or Latino of any race were 3.20% of the population.

There were 382 households, out of which 36.9% had children under the age of 18 living with them, 74.3% were married couples living together, 6.5% had a female householder with no husband present, and 15.2% were non-families. 12.6% of all households were made up of individuals, and 2.1% had someone living alone who was 65 years of age or older. The average household size was 2.86 and the average family size was 3.10.

In the town, the population was spread out, with 25.8% under the age of 18, 6.9% from 18 to 24, 26.1% from 25 to 44, 35.6% from 45 to 64, and 5.7% who were 65 years of age or older. The median age was 41 years. For every 100 females, there were 104.7 males. For every 100 females age 18 and over, there were 105.3 males.

The median income for a household in the town was $95,259, and the median income for a family was $98,140. Males had a median income of $63,750 versus $43,625 for females. The per capita income for the town was $43,706. About 3.1% of families and 4.4% of the population were below the poverty line, including 6.6% of those under age 18 and 4.5% of those age 65 or over.

Education
Different portions of Bartonville are served by the Denton Independent School District (east-south) and by the Argyle Independent School District (north-west).

Most of Denton ISD Bartonville is zoned to Adkins Elementary School, while a single parcel is zoned to  E. P. Rayzor Elementary School. The Denton ISD part is zoned to Harpool Middle School, and Guyer High School.

References

External links
 Town of Bartonville official website
 The Cross Timbers Gazette, local newspaper
 Handbook of Texas Online article

Dallas–Fort Worth metroplex
Towns in Denton County, Texas
Towns in Texas
Populated places established in 1878